Molannidae is a family of Hood casemakers in the order Trichoptera. There are at least 3 genera and 40 described species in Molannidae.

The type genus for Molannidae is Molanna J Curtis, 1834.

Genera
 Indomolannodes Wiggins, 1968
 Molanna Curtis, 1834
 Molannodes McLachlan, 1866

References

Further reading

 
 
 
 
 
 
 
 

Trichoptera families
Integripalpia